Ursula Vernon (born May 28, 1977) is an American freelance writer, artist and illustrator. She has won numerous awards for her work in various mediums, including the Hugo Award for her graphic novel Digger, the Nebula Award for her short story "Jackalope Wives", and Mythopoeic Awards for adult and children's literature. Vernon's books for children include Hamster Princess and Dragonbreath. Under the name T. Kingfisher, she is also the author of books for older audiences. She writes short fiction under both names.

Career 
Ursula Vernon grew up in Oregon and Arizona. She studied anthropology at Macalester College in Saint Paul, Minnesota, where she first took art classes. She first became known for her webcomics and as a freelance artist, particularly for her works containing anthropomorphic animals. She then moved into writing and illustrating a number of children's books, her first being published in 2008, and then books for adults under the pseudonym T. Kingfisher. She decided to start using the pseudonym in order to avoid confusion amongst parents who were only familiar with her as a children's book author, and chose it because she loves kingfishers (and as an homage to Ursula K. LeGuin, who once joked that the initials "U.K." could stand for "Ulysses Kingfisher"). Vernon has published short fiction under both names, and has won a number of awards for them including the Hugo Award and Nebula Award.

She regularly attends conventions to exhibit and sell her work. She has been a guest of honor at Midwest FurFest 2004 and 2009, and the Artist Guest of Honor at Further Confusion 2010. Vernon was the Author Guest of Honor for Mythcon 45 and a Guest of Honor at Eurofurence 20, both in August 2014.  In 2017, she was the Author Guest of Honor at Arisia '17.

Vernon podcasts with her husband, Kevin Sonney.

Works

Books for younger audiences 
Vernon is the author and illustrator of the Dragonbreath and Hamster Princess children's book series, published by Dial Books:

Dragonbreath series

Hamster Princess series

Other children's books 
 Nurk: The Strange Surprising Adventures Of A (Somewhat) Brave Shrew was published by Harcourt in 2008 and released as an audiobook in 2009. It was Vernon's first published children's book.
 Castle Hangnail (April 21, 2015) Dial Books

Books for older audiences 

The following books were written as Ursula Vernon and published by Sofawolf Press.

Temple of the White Rat books 

The following books were written under the name T. Kingfisher and take place in what Vernon calls "the Temple of the White Rat world."

Other books for older audiences 

The following books were also written under the name T. Kingfisher.

Webcomics
Vernon is the author of the Eisner Award-nominated and Hugo Award-winning webcomic Digger. A fantasy story featuring an anthropomorphic wombat, it is also available in six paperback books published between 2005 and 2011: Vol. 1, Vol. 2, Vol. 3, Vol. 4, Vol. 5, and Vol. 6, and as Digger: The Complete Omnibus Edition, published in 2013. She is also the writer and illustrator of the webcomic Irrational Fears and the short stories "Little Creature" and "Little Creature and the Redcap".

Illustrations and art 
Before becoming a published children's book author Vernon was primarily a freelance artist and illustrator, and she still regularly produces new works of art. Her work includes the creation of digital art as well as the use of more traditional mediums such as watercolour and acrylics, with much of her more recent work being mixed media. Most of her art work is available as prints. Vernon has also taken commercial commissions such as book covers and game art.

The game Black Sheep designed by Reiner Knizia and published by Fantasy Flight Games uses art by Vernon on its playing cards.

Her artwork titled The Biting Pear of Salamanca became an internet meme in the form of the "LOL WUT pear" and has been made into a resin figurine due to its popularity. She has also designed labels for a series of tea and soap products.

Awards and nominations 

Vernon has also received the following accolades:
 Her cover for Best in Show won the 2003 Ursa Major Award for Best Anthropomorphic Published Illustration. 
 For her work on Digger, Vernon was nominated for the 2006 Eisner Awards in the category "Talent Deserving of Wider Recognition", and won the 2005 Web Cartoonists' Choice Award for "Outstanding Black and White Art". Digger has also been nominated in the "Outstanding Anthropomorphic Comic" category. 
 "Jackalope Wives" (2014), "The Tomato Thief" (2016) and "Metal Like Blood in the Dark" (2020) won the WSFA Small Press Award.

See also

Notes

References

External links
Personal websites
 
 RedWombatStudio.com, art website
 Bark Like a Fish, Damnit!, public Livejournal blog (last updated 2017)
 Digger webcomic
Socials
 
 Ursula Vernon at Goodreads
 UrsulaV, Ursula Vernon's deviantART page
Catalogs
 
 
 Ursula Vernon at Fantastic Fiction
 Free Speculative Fiction Online, accessed Mar 4, 2022
Publishers

 Ursula Vernon at Penguin Random
 Ursula Vernon at Argyll
 Ursula Vernon on Uncanny Mag
 Ursula Vernon on Audible

1977 births
21st-century American novelists
21st-century American women writers
American comic strip cartoonists
American children's writers
American fantasy writers
American female comics artists
American graphic novelists
American women novelists
American webcomic creators
Female comics writers
Furry fandom people
Hugo Award-winning writers
Living people
Nebula Award winners
Macalester College alumni
Women science fiction and fantasy writers